HMS Surprize was a 24-gun sixth rate ship of the Royal Navy.  She was built to the 1741 revised specifications of the 1719 Establishment by James Wyatt and John Major at Bucklers Hard on the Beaulieu River in Hampshire and launched on 27 January 1745.

She was broken up in 1770.

References
Winfield, Rif, British Warships in the Age of Sail 1714–1792: Design, Construction, Careers and Fates. Seaforth Publishing, 2007. .

Ships of the line of the Royal Navy
1746 ships
Ships built on the Beaulieu River